The Atlantic Coast Conference football champions includes 11 distinct teams that have won the college football championship awarded by the Atlantic Coast Conference (ACC) since its creation in 1953. Sixteen teams have competed in the conference since that year. Four teams—Miami, Boston College, Syracuse, and Louisville—have never won an ACC football championship, while two schools that are no longer a member of the league hold championships: Maryland holds nine championships and South Carolina holds one championship.

Between 1953 and 2003, the championship was normally earned in round-robin regular-season play among all conference members, although in earlier years league teams did not typically play every possible ACC opponent. The league did not employ tiebreaking procedures, such as head-to-head results, to determine a single champion, and thus it was not unusual for a season to end with "co-champions." With a 2004 expansion of the league to include Miami and Virginia Tech, round-robin play became impossible due to an NCAA limit on the number of games a team may play during the season and the unwillingness of the league to hold more than eight conference games per season per team. NCAA rules also forbade a championship game due to the league having only 11 members.

A 2005 expansion that admitted Boston College gave the ACC the required 12 members needed for divisional play and a championship game. The ACC Championship Game has been held annually since that year, featuring the regular-season winners of the Atlantic and Coastal divisions in a game to determine the conference champion.

During the 2005, 2006, and 2007 seasons, the championship game was held at Alltel Stadium in Jacksonville, Florida. In 2008 and 2009, the championship was held at Raymond James Stadium in Tampa, Florida. From 2010 through 2015 the game was held at Bank of America Stadium in Charlotte, North Carolina. It returned to Florida in 2016 when it was held at Camping World Stadium in Orlando, but moved back to Charlotte in 2017 where the championship game is slated to remain through 2030.

Early era 

The charter members of the ACC were Clemson, Duke, Maryland, North Carolina, North Carolina State, South Carolina, and Wake Forest. The seven ACC charter members had been aligned with the Southern Conference, but left due in part to the conference's ban on postseason play. The ACC officially came into existence on June 14, 1953. The 1953 NCAA University Division football season, the first under the new conference, saw Duke and Maryland crowned conference co-champions. Maryland later went on to be crowned national champions before losing the 1954 Orange Bowl.

On December 4, 1953, conference officials convened in Greensboro, North Carolina, and admitted the University of Virginia as the eighth member of the conference. Virginia was the first non-Southern Conference member to join the new conference, as Virginia had played football with no conference affiliation since 1936. The conference operated with eight members until June 30, 1971, when the University of South Carolina left to become an independent.

After South Carolina's departure, the ACC operated with seven members until April 3, 1978, when the Georgia Institute of Technology was admitted. The Atlanta school had withdrawn from the Southeastern Conference in January 1964 and had operated as an independent before joining the ACC. Though the school joined the conference beginning with the 1979 season, it did not become eligible to win the ACC football championship until the 1983 season. Seven years after beginning full ACC play, Georgia Tech won its first ACC football championship en route to winning the 1990 NCAA Division I football championship.

In the fall of 1982, Clemson University was put on probation by the NCAA for recruiting violations. The probation forbade the team from participating in any bowl games, reduced the scholarships available to the team, and rendered the team ineligible for ACC football championship competition. Though the team still played its full slate of games during the 1983 season and finished 9–1–1, Maryland, which finished with an 8–4 record, was awarded the ACC football championship.

The ACC expanded to nine members on September 15, 1990, with the addition of Florida State. Beginning with the 1992 football season—its first in the ACC—Florida State won or shared the ACC football championship nine consecutive times. The conference expanded to 11 members on July 1, 2004, with the addition of the University of Miami and Virginia Polytechnic Institute and State University.

Miami and Virginia Tech began official ACC play with the 2004 season, but because the league was forbidden from hosting a championship game, the conference was forced to award a championship based on regular-season play (round-robin scheduling was no longer used beginning that season). Virginia Tech, which had the best conference record at the conclusion of the season, was awarded the ACC championship.

Championship game era 

Following the admittance of Boston College into the conference beginning with the 2005–2006 season, the conference began to play an annual championship game to conclude the season. The new 12-team conference was divided into two divisions, and the champion of each division (the team with the best conference record in each division) was awarded an invitation to the conference championship game.

The first championship game was held in Jacksonville, Florida, on December 3, 2005, with Florida State (champions of the Atlantic Division) defeating Virginia Tech (Coastal Division champions), 27–22. In 2006, Wake Forest faced off against Georgia Tech for the championship. In the lowest-scoring conference championship game in Division I history, Wake defeated Georgia Tech, 9–6. The 2007 game saw Virginia Tech return to the contest, this time facing off against Boston College. In their second ACC Championship Game, Tech defeated Boston College, 30–16.

The 2008 ACC Championship Game was held in Raymond James Stadium in Tampa, Florida, on December 6, 2008. Virginia Tech won by a score of 30–12, becoming the first ACC team to win consecutive ACC championship games. Tampa also hosted the 2009 ACC Championship Game which was won by Georgia Tech over Clemson. Poor attendance in both of the Florida locations caused a move to Charlotte, North Carolina's Bank of America Stadium where the game has been held yearly since 2010 with the exception of 2016 when it was held at Camping World Stadium in Orlando. The game is to remain in Charlotte through 2030.

Champions by year

Championships by school

† Co-champions

‡ Georgia Tech was forced to vacate the 2009 ACC Championship in response to NCAA violations

See also

 List of Atlantic Coast Conference football standings

References

Atlantic Coast Conference
champions